Phil Purnell (born 16 September 1964) is a former professional association footballer who spent the majority of his career with Bristol Rovers. Before turning professional in 1985, Purnell played for West Country non-league sides Forest Green Rovers, Frome Town and Mangotsfield United, until signing for Bristol Rovers in September 1985. He went on to make 153 league appearances for The Pirates in a -year spell at the club, scoring twenty-two goals. He was loaned to Swansea City for a month in December 1991, where he played five league games and scored once.

Purnell's playing career ended when he suffered a broken leg in April 1993. He was awarded a testimonial match in the summer of 1994, when Bristol Rovers faced a Queens Park Rangers side managed by former Rovers manager Gerry Francis, and featuring a number of former Bristol Rovers players.

After retiring from playing, he worked in insurance, and also continued in football on a part-time basis as assistant manager of Yate Town, where his former Rovers teammate Ian Alexander was manager, and also at Winterbourne United.

Sources

1964 births
Living people
Footballers from Bristol
English footballers
Association football midfielders
English Football League players
Forest Green Rovers F.C. players
Frome Town F.C. players
Mangotsfield United F.C. players
Bristol Rovers F.C. players
Swansea City A.F.C. players